Top Mates is a 1979 Australian TV mini-series.

Synopsis
The series centres on two boys, Paul Jackson and Brett Towers. Paul starts attending a new school, where he meets Brett, and both run away from school.

Cast
Michael McGlinchey
Angela Gauci
Patrick Matthews
Justine Saunders
Tessa Mallos
Ray Meagher
Candy Williams

Production
The script was written by Anne Brooksbank and Margaret Kelly, and the series was made by ABC Television.

Release
It was aired by the ABC in Australia in 1979, and on BBC TV in the UK in 1989.

References

External links

Australian Broadcasting Corporation original programming
1970s Australian television miniseries
1979 Australian television series debuts
1979 Australian television series endings
Television shows set in Sydney